Latif Nangarhari ([[Pashto لطیف ننګرهاری, born about 1981) is a well known Afghan singer. He sings in the Pashto language (although has one Dari (Persian) song). He is an ethnic Pashtun born in Jalalabad in Nangarhar Province (a reference from his surname), and has lived in London, England since 2001.

Latif's first songs were released in 2008, with his first and so far only album, Rasha Gule, consisting of 10 songs, in 2009. He quickly became popular, especially because many of his songs are based on poetry and about peace in Afghanistan.

Latif has performed concerts throughout Australia, Europe, Russia, and the Middle East.

Rasha Gule album
1. Rasha Gule Rasha
2. Che Bangro
3. Sta Judaye
4. De London Musafer
5. Kabul Jan
6. Nana Warokai
7. Afghanistan
8. Wale Maien Shaway
9. Yara Sta
10. Rasha Gule Rasha II

Singles
Afghanistan De Wranawalo Nadai
Chashman
Bangrrewale
Shirin Afghanistan
Zolfi De Maran De
Eshara
Sta Stergo Deewana Kerem
Meena
Wade Kawo
Shar E Faryad
Da Afghan Bacho Maktab
Za Afghan Yem
Da Stergi De Biya Dasi Laki Dary
Ta raghely Pa Zuani
Zama jan jan watana afghan watana

References

External links
 Latif Nangarhari's Official Website at Facebook
  Latif Nangarhari Official Channel

Living people
21st-century Afghan male singers
Pashtun singers
1980s births
People from Nangarhar Province